Aero Contractors is the name of two unrelated air transport companies:

 Aero Contractors (Nigeria), an airline based in Lagos, Nigeria
 Aero Contractors (US), an alleged front for the CIA